Joanneumite, confirmed as a new mineral in 2012, is the first recognized isocyanurate mineral, with the formula Cu(C3N3O3H2)2(NH3)2. It is also an ammine-containing mineral, a feature shared with ammineite, chanabayaite and shilovite. All the minerals are very rare and were found in a guano deposit in Pabellón de Pica, Chile.

See also
Copper(II) cyanurate

References

Copper(II) minerals
Organic minerals
Triclinic minerals
Minerals in space group 2
Minerals described in 2017